Georg Preuße (Pseudonym Mary Morgan) (born 24 August 1950 in Ankum) is a German actor and drag performer.

Life
After school in Ankum, Preuße became a radio and television engineer. He later started performing in shows and clubs as an actor En travesti. In the 1980s, nationally famous in Germany, he first played the role of Mary Morgan. He worked together with actor Reiner Kohler, who played Gordy Blanche. In the 1990s and 2000s, Preuße played different roles in German theatre.

Preuße, who is openly gay, lives in Berlin and Switzerland.

Works by Preuße

Theatre 
 Musical Cabaret - Conferencier

TV
 „Mary & Gordy“-Shows: Spaß an der Verwandlung 1- 3
 Mary-Shows. 25 editions (with gags, songs, dance and talkshows)
 Mary-Revues: Die frech-frivole Illusion. Sternschnuppen.
 TV moderations: Marys Quiz - Baden-Badener RouletteFilm
 Mary & Gordy auf dem Land Frau'n Frau'n Frau'n Marys verrücktes Krankenhaus Derrick – „Das erste aller Lieder“Awards
 1990: Goldene Kamera for Mary and Gordy''

Notes

External links
 Mary Preuße
 Works of Mary and Gordy
 
 

1950 births
Living people
German gay actors
German male stage actors
German male television actors
German male film actors
People from Osnabrück (district)
German drag queens